Kamal Mahsud (Pashto & ) was a Pashto language folk singer of Waziristan, Khyber Pakhtunkhwa, Pakistan. He died on January 7, 2010.

Mahsud was a popular singer in his home province. His better-known songs include Tum Chalay Aawo and Da Ghroona Ghroona. An album of his songs for peace was distributed free by the Inter Services Public Relations in South Waziristan.

References

2010 deaths
Pakistani folk singers
Pashtun people
Year of birth missing